Positive Coaching Alliance (PCA) is an American non-profit organization which strives to create a positive youth sports environment.

Since its founding in 1998, PCA has established 18 chapters nationwide and has delivered more than 20,000 live group workshops to over 19.2 million youths. PCA offers interactive online courses and offers tools for coaches, parents, and athletes. PCA also runs two annual awards programs: a scholarship program for high school student-athletes and a coach award program.

PCA gains support from a National Advisory Board of elite coaches, professional and Olympic athletes, organization leaders, and academics. PCA partners with more than 50 national governing bodies, organizations and professional leagues and teams including Boys & Girls Club of America, National Basketball Association, Major League Baseball, and US Lacrosse.

PCA Impact

PCA programming is research-based. Data indicate that as a result of PCA programming youth experience improved life skills and character development, coaches become more positive and increase their focus on using sports to teach life lessons, and youth sports organizations and schools see their cultures become more positive.

Awards
The Positive Coaching Alliance gives out the Ronald L. Jensen award for Lifetime Achievement.  The winners include:
 2006 - Ted Leland
 2007 - John Gagliardi
 2008 - Jim Sochor
 2009 - Tara VanDerveer
 2010 - John Wooden
 2011 - Bruce Bochy
 2012 - Dick Gould
 2013 - Phil Jackson
 2014 - Joe Ehrmann
 2015 - Dusty Baker
 2016 - Billie Jean King
 2017 - Carol Dweck
 2018 - Steve Young
 2019 - Brandi Chastain, Julie Foudy, and Mia Hamm

References

External links
 Positive Coaching Alliance Website
 PCA DevZone - Resource Website
 Positive Coaching Alliance YouTube Channel

Charities based in California